Shiren the Wanderer is a roguelike video game developed by Chunsoft for the Wii. It was released in Japan on June 5, 2008, and in North America on February 9, 2010. A PlayStation Portable version was released later in 2010.

Gameplay
Similar to Dragon Quest Characters: Torneko no Daibōken 3, the level is inherited in the main story. However, as before, dungeons starting from level 1 and high-difficulty dungeons after clearing are also available. There are more than 30 dungeons, new monsters and new to the game, tool growth systems. The player can choose between easy and normal difficulty levels to make it easier for newcomers of the genre to play. In the normal difficulty, should the player lose in a dungeon, they will lose all of their items. In contrary, they would not lose their items in the other difficulty.

Plot
The game's plot happens one year after Shiren the Wanderer GB2: Magic Castle of the Desert. Shiren and his partner Koppa reunites with his swordsman, Sensei, then led by him to embark on a journey to solve the mystery of the legendary Karakuri Mansion.

Development
Initially scheduled to be released on February 28, 2008, Shiren the Wanderer'''s initial Japanese release was delayed to June 2008 for quality assurance and bug fixes.  In an interview article released by Atlus' business partner Sega, the game's developers stated that they would avoid making use of the Wii Remote's unique motion controls out of a concern that they would not be in line with the original, classic gameplay of prior installments.   They thus came up with two control schemes that would heavily rely on analog sticks: a default one that uses the Wii Remote and Nunchuk and an alternate one that employs the Classic Controller, the latter which they recommended.

Releases
The game was released on June 5, 2008 in Japan by Sega, then nearly two years later in North America on February 9, 2010 by Atlus USA. Its PlayStation Portable port was released solely in Japan on January 28, 2010.

Reception

The Wii version of Shiren the Wanderer 3 received mixed or average reviews based on twenty-one critic reviews, according to review aggregator Metacritic. The game received a score of 35 of 40 from Famitsu'' magazine. It sold 59,000 units in its debut week in Japan.

Notes

References

External links
Official website

Role-playing video games
Atlus games
Chunsoft games
Spike (company) games
PlayStation Portable games
Sega video games
Wii games
Video games scored by Hayato Matsuo
Video games set in feudal Japan
2008 video games
Mystery Dungeon
Roguelike video games
Video games using procedural generation
Video games developed in Japan